Much Hadham, formerly known as Great Hadham, is a village and civil parish in the district of East Hertfordshire, Hertfordshire, England. The parish of Much Hadham contains the hamlets of Perry Green and Green Tye, as well as the village of Much Hadham itself and Hadham Cross. The village of Much Hadham is situated midway between Ware and Bishop's Stortford. The population of the parish was recorded as 2,087 in the 2011 census, an increase from 1,994 in 2001.

History
The name "Hadham" probably derives from Old English words meaning "Heath homestead".  The affix "Much" comes from the Old English "mycel", meaning "great". The name changed around the time of the Civil War.

The parish has been occupied since the Roman period.  There were pottery kilns in the parish in the Roman period, and a Roman coin hoard has been found nearby.

Written records of Much Hadham go back to the time of King Edgar.  The village was a possession of the Bishops of London before the Norman Conquest, and it appears in the Domesday Book as "Hadham". The parish church was built from 1220–1450.  The village was a staging point on the road from London to Cambridge and Newmarket, and the Olde Red Lion Inn, built in 15th century to serve this traffic, still survives in the village.

The Bishop's Palace was used as an asylum from 1817–1863.

During the First World War, there was a British Red Cross/Order of St. John auxiliary hospital in Much Hadham.  Today, a plaque on the front of Woodham House commemorates this.

During the second world war, Much Hadham was the site of Prisoner of War camp 69.  The camp was opened in 1939, housing Italian prisoners of war, and later German prisoners, as well as housing American and Gurkha soldiers as they prepared for the D-Day landings. The camp closed around 1950.

Geography
The village is linear stretched along its mile and a half long high street (High Street, Tower Hill and Widford Road) which runs along the river Ash. The village had a railway station on the Buntingford single track branch line, which closed in 1965 under the Beeching Axe.

Landmarks

There are two church buildings in Much Hadham, the parish church and a Congregational church. Much Hadham's parish church, built largely between 1225 and 1450, is shared between the St. Andrew's Church of England congregation and the Holy Cross Roman Catholic congregation. The entrance to the church is adorned with two sculptures by Henry Moore. The more recent Congregational church dates from 1872.

There are many listed buildings in Much Hadham, including four listed at Grade I. These are the St Andrew's Parish Church, Much Hadham Hall, Moor Place and the boundary wall at Yewtree Farmhouse at Hadham Cross.  The Parish's many Grade II Star Listed buildings include The Lordship, The Red House, Yew Tree Farmhouse and Much Hadham Palace, the site of a residence of the Bishops of London.

The Henry Moore Foundation can be found in Perry Green, and includes Moore's home.  In December 2005, thieves stole a 1970 bronze of a reclining figure from the site, which was melted and sold for scrap metal.

 
The Red Lion coaching inn, now converted into private houses, has been in the village since the 15th century. It was a stopping point on the old road from London to Cambridge. Legend has it that the inn is connected to St. Andrew's by a tunnel, possibly built during the time of Oliver Cromwell as an escape route for the clergy. This is highly unlikely given the height of the water table.

Government
Much Hadham is a civil parish in the East Hertfordshire District. It is one of thirty wards to make up East Hertfordshire District Council. It is part of the Hertford and Stortford Parliamentary Constituency.

Education
St Andrew's Church of England Primary School in Much Hadham is a Church of England school with links to the parish church of St Andrew's.  It has about 250 pupils between the ages of 4 and 11.  The school also has a nursery in the mornings for younger children. A village school has existed in the village since the 1840s. The first now known as the Flint House. A second independent pre prep school in Much Hadham, the Barn School, closed in 1998. There is also a pre-school with about 40 children aged between 2 and 4.

Outside the village of Much Hadham in the hamlet of Perry Green there is St. Elizabeth's School and residence for children and young adults with epilepsy, established in 1903, the second largest employer in the District.

Much Hadham has a small museum, The Forge Museum, which contains preserved Elizabethan wall-paintings as well as information about local history. The Henry Moore Foundation in Perry Green houses a large collection of the artist's work.

Sport
The village has the charitable Sports Association which runs the publicly owned Recreation Ground and facilities. There is an infants' playground and a newly refurbished sports pavilion completed in 2015, used by the village football team and for social events.

Much Hadham Cricket Club (founded in 1889) withdrew from the Herts & Essex League in 2007 and cricket is now no longer played. The village has a football team and Tennis and Bowls Clubs are open to anyone to join for an annual fee, all on the Recreation Ground.

Notable residents
Adjacent to the church is Much Hadham Palace, a country home of the Bishops of London for 800 years. Edmund Tudor, father of Henry VII, may have been born in the Palace. It was sold by the church for the last time in 1888.

Alexander Nowell, dean of St. Paul's, was rector of Much Hadham from 1862, and fished in the river Ash.
The sculptor Henry Moore lived in Perry Green until his death.
Charles Fitzroy Doll, architect lived at Hadham Towers.

See also
 The Hundred Parishes

References

External links 

The Hadhams – Little Hadham and Much Hadham Community Website

 
Villages in Hertfordshire
Civil parishes in Hertfordshire
East Hertfordshire District